Murphy's Law is a BBC television drama, produced by Tiger Aspect Productions for BBC Northern Ireland, starring James Nesbitt as an undercover police officer, Tommy Murphy. There were five series of the drama, shown on BBC One.  The first two were composed of individual stories. Series three, four and five were each single stories composed over multiple episodes. Colin Bateman adapted the pilot for a novel.

A sixth series has not been commissioned. In a 2008 interview, Nesbitt attributed this to the fifth series' ratings being damaged after it was scheduled opposite ITV's popular drama Doc Martin.

All 23 episodes have since been released on DVD. All episodes from series two onwards were released as edited 50-minute masters instead of the 60-minute versions that were broadcast, except series 3 which was released uncut in the US. The first, second and third series were all released on 28 August 2006. The fourth and fifth series were released in a joint box-set on 15 October 2007.

Plot
Detective Sergeant Tommy Murphy (James Nesbitt) is an uncompromising, sometimes tough talking cop. He has no issues with using his charm and sense of humour to attempt to impress any woman, especially Annie, his colleague and later boss. Murphy was previously married with a young daughter, in Northern Ireland. There, his family were taken hostage and he was forced to make a choice; either carry a bomb and blow himself up in a local barracks, or have his daughter killed.

He originally chose the first option but when he got to the barracks he couldn't go through with detonating a bomb that would kill a hundred people. When he got back to the house, he found that they had slit his daughter's throat and that his wife had been forced to watch. His decision affected almost everything he does in life. He reflects at intervals, and remarks that he received 'a nice medal' for 'saving' so many lives, by making such a sacrifice. Yet, he still feels responsible for his daughter's death.

Cast
 D.S. Tommy Murphy – James Nesbitt 
 D.C.S. Edward Rees – Michael Feast (Series 3)
 D.C.S. John Atwood – Robbie Gee (Series 5)
 C.S. Ken Bowry – Ian Redford (Series 5)
 D.C.I. Derek Warren – Francis Magee (Series 4)
 D.I. Annie Guthrie – Claudia Harrison (Series 1)
 D.I. Hilary Clark – Sarah Berger (Series 2)
 D.S. Paul Allison – Owen Teale (Series 3)
 D.S. Mitch Kershaw – Tim Dantay (Series 5)
 D.C. Alan Carter – Del Synott (Series 1–2) 
 D.C. Michael Ollington – Shaun Dooley (Series 3)
 D.C. Kim Goodall – Andrea Lowe (Series 5)
 D.C. Jackie Cole –  Jessica Oyelowo (Series 5)
 Father McBride – Mark Benton (Series 1–2)

Episode list

Series 1 (2001–2003)

Series 2 (2004)

Series 3 (2005)

Series 4 (2006)

Series 5 (2007)

References

External links 
 
 
 
 

2001 British television series debuts
2007 British television series endings
2000s British crime drama television series
BBC television dramas
Television series by Endemol
Television series by Tiger Aspect Productions
British crime drama television series
British detective television series
English-language television shows
Television shows set in Northern Ireland
Television shows based on British novels